Zhongyuan, or the Central Plain, is the area on the lower reaches of the Yellow River which formed the cradle of Chinese civilization

Mainland China
 Zhongyuan Mandarin, dialect of Mandarin Chinese spoken on the Central Plain
 Zhongyuan Airlines, former airline based in Henan
 Zhongyuan District, Zhengzhou
 Zhongyuan, Hainan, town in Qionghai
 Zhongyuan, Shaanxi, town in Hanbin District, Ankang
 West Zhongyuan Road Subdistrict (中原西路街道), formerly Zhongyuan Township, in Zhongyuan District, Zhengzhou
 Zhongyuan Township, Gansu, in Zhenyuan County
 Zhongyuan Township, Jiangxi (中源乡), in Jing'an County
 Zhongyuan Festival (中元节), a Taoist holiday

Taiwan
 Chung Yuan Christian University, in Zhongli, Taoyuan County, Taiwan